Major General Frank Augustus Keating (February 4, 1895 – April 28, 1973) was a career officer of the United States Army who commanded the 102nd Infantry Division during World War II, was Governor of the U.S. Zone of Germany, and was Chief U.S. Military Advisor to Korea.

Early life and military career
He was born in New York City and entered military service on May 18, 1915. He served in combat in France from 1917 to 1918 during World War I and then became an instructor at the Infantry Weapons School in Chatillion-Sur-Seine, France.

Between the wars
From 1921 to 1922 he was a student in the Company Officers’ Course at Fort Benning, Georgia, and shortly thereafter served in Japan, the Philippines and Hawaii. In 1939 he graduated from the U.S. Army Command and General Staff School at Fort Leavenworth, Kansas and was assigned to the 15th Infantry Regiment at Camp Lewis, Washington where he served with Major Mark W. Clark and Lieutenant Colonel Dwight D. Eisenhower.

World War II
In May 1942, during World War II, he became commander of the Amphibious Training Center at Camp Edwards, Massachusetts. In January 1944 he assumed command of the 102nd Infantry Division.

Postwar

He served as Military Governor of Germany from May 1945 to January 1946 when he was assigned as Commander of Troops in Berlin, Deputy Military Governor of the U.S. Zone of Germany and Deputy to General Lucius D. Clay of the Allied Control Council. In 1950 he was appointed Chief U.S. Military Advisor to Korea and retired on August 31, 1950.

Decorations
Major General Keating's decorations include: Distinguished Service Medal with Oak Leaf Cluster, Legion of Merit, Bronze Star Medal, Army Commendation Medal with Oak Leaf Cluster, Mexican Border Service Medal, World War I Victory Medal, Grand Officer of the Order of the White Lion, American Defense Service Medal, American Campaign Medal, World War II Victory Medal, Army of Occupation Medal, National Defense Service Medal, Korean Service Medal, United Nations Korea Medal, Croix de guerre 1939–1945 with Palm, Commander of the Legion of Honour and the Order of the Red Banner.

References

External links

Papers of Frank A. Keating, Dwight D. Eisenhower Presidential Library 
Generals of World War II

1895 births
1973 deaths
United States Army Infantry Branch personnel
Military personnel from New York City
United States Army personnel of World War I
United States Army Command and General Staff College alumni
Burials at Arlington National Cemetery
Recipients of the Legion of Merit
Recipients of the Distinguished Service Medal (US Army)
Grand Officers of the Order of the White Lion
United States Army generals of World War II
United States Army generals